This is a list of airlines currently operating in Finland.

Scheduled airlines

Charter airlines

See also
 List of airlines
 List of defunct airlines of Europe
 List of defunct airlines of Finland

References

Airlines

Finland
Airlines
Finland